Feels Right may refer to:

"Feels Right", a 2016 single by Jocelyn Alice
"Feels Right", a 2004 song by Lemar from Time to Grow
"Feels Right", a 2019 song by Carly Rae Jepsen from Dedicated
"Feels Right", a 2020 song by Biig Piig

See also
Feel Right (disambiguation)